Hajar is an alternative transliteration for the Biblical person Hagar.

Hajar may also refer to:

Hajar an-Nasar, a fortress and sometime capital of northern Morocco
 Pen name of Abdurrahman Sharafkandi, a Kurdish writer and poet
Hajar Khatoon Mosque, ancient Muslim mosque (now a tourist destination) in the city of Sanandaj in the Kurdistan province of Iran.
Hajar Mountains, mountains in northern Oman and also the eastern United Arab Emirates
Central Hajar Mountains, the central subrange of the Hajar, entirely in Oman
Eastern Hajar Mountains, the eastern subrange, entirely in Oman
Western Hajar Mountains, the western subrange, shared between Oman and the UAE

See also
Hagar (disambiguation)
Al Hajar (disambiguation)
Hajjar (disambiguation)